Yemaatrathe Yemaaraathe is a 1985 Tamil-language action film directed by V. C. Guhanathan. The film stars Vijayakanth, Archana and Anuradha.

Cast 

Vijayakanth
Archana
Anuradha
Vijayakumar
Sumithra
Nizhalgal Ravi

Soundtrack
The soundtrack was composed by Chandrabose.
 "Pudikkaiyile.." - P. Jayachandran, S. P. Sailaja
 "Ila Maalai Nilavo.." - S. P. Balasubrahmanyam, S. P. Sailaja & Chorus
 "Naana Vambukku.." - T. M. Soundararajan & Chorus
 "Engal Thamizhinam.." - Malaysia Vasudevan
 "Iru Kannil.." - Malaysia Vasudevan, Vani Jairam

Reception
Jayamanmadhan of Kalki wrote that as the title says do not be fooled, he had nothing else to say.

References

External links
 

1985 films
1980s Tamil-language films
Films scored by Chandrabose (composer)
Indian action films